Sal Creole is the name given to the variant of Cape Verdean Creole spoken mainly in the island of Sal of Cape Verde. It belongs to the Barlavento Creoles branch. The speakers of this form of Cape Verdean Creole are 15,000.

Characteristics
Besides the main characteristics of Barlavento Creoles the Sal Creole has also the following ones:
 The progressive aspect of the present is formed by putting tâ tâ before the verbs: tâ + tâ + V.
 In the verbs that end by ~a, that sound  is represented by  when the verb is conjugated with the first person of the singular pronoun. Ex.: panhó-m’  instead of panhâ-m’  “to catch me”, levó-m’  instead of levâ-m’  “to take me”, coçó-m’ /koˈsɔm/ instead of coçâ-m’  “to scratch me”.
Ex. jantâ  instead of djantâ  “to dine”, jôg’  instead of djôgu  “game”, but in words like djâ  “already”, Djõ  “John” the sound  remains.

Vocabulary

Grammar

Phonology

Alphabet

References

Sal, Cape Verde